Hübner Nyíregyháza BS is a Hungarian professional basketball team based in Nyíregyháza. The team currently plays in the Nemzeti Bajnokság I/A, the highest level of basketball in Hungary. The team plays its home games in the Continental Arena. Their nickname is Blue Sharks.

Notable players

  Gergely Toth
  Manny Suarez
  Nigel Johnson
  Seth Leday

Current roster

References

External links
Eurobasket.com profile

Basketball teams in Hungary
Nyíregyháza